The 1991 Sacramento State Hornets football team represented California State University, Sacramento as a member of the Western Football Conference (WFC) during the 1991 NCAA Division II football season. Led by 14th-year head coach Bob Mattos, Sacramento State compiled an overall record of 8–2 with a mark of 3–2 in conference play, placing third in the WFC. The team outscored its opponents 367 to 224 for the season. The Hornets played home games at Hornet Stadium in Sacramento, California.

Schedule

Team players in the NFL
No Sacramento State players were selected in the 1992 NFL Draft.

The following finished their college career in 1991, were not drafted, but played in the NFL.

References

Sacramento State
Sacramento State Hornets football seasons
Sacramento State Hornets football